Williot Theo Swedberg (born 1 February 2004) is a Swedish professional footballer who plays as an attacking midfielder for Celta de Vigo in La Liga.

Early life
Born and primarily raised in Stockholm, Swedberg also partly lived in Valencia, Spain, during his childhood. He started to play youth football with local club Sickla IF. In 2011, at age seven, he joined the youth academy of Hammarby IF. In 2019, he went on trial with Premier League club Tottenham Hotspur.

Club career

Hammarby IF
In 2020, Swedberg was sent on loan to Hammarby's affiliated club IK Frej in Ettan, the domestic third tier, where he made his debut in senior football. He began the 2021 season on loan at feeder team Hammarby TFF, also competing in Ettan.

On 11 July 2021, Swedberg made his competitive debut for Hammarby in Allsvenskan, in a 5–1 home win against Degerfors IF, coming on from the bench in the 79th minute and scoring two minutes later. After his debut, Swedberg reportedly attracted interest from Danish clubs Brøndby IF and FC Midtjylland. On 12 August, Swedberg signed a new three-year deal until 2024 with Hammarby, his first professional contract. He featured in five games as the side reached the play-off round of the 2021–22 UEFA Europa Conference League, after eliminating Maribor (4–1 on aggregate) and FK Čukarički (6–4 on aggregate, in which Swedberg scored). In the playoff, then, Hammarby was knocked out by Basel (4–4 on aggregate) after a penalty shoot-out. In October 2021, Swedberg was named as one of the 60 best young talents in world football born in 2004, by the English newspaper The Guardian.

On 23 February 2022, Swedberg was close to join Lokomotiv Moscow for a reported fee of around €4.5 million, but the deal ultimately fell through due to administrative reasons and the political instability following Russia's invasion of Ukraine. He had a strong start to the 2022 season, scoring five goals in the first five league fixtures, awarding him Allsvenskan Player of the Month in April. Swedberg featured in the final of the 2021–22 Svenska Cupen, in which Hammarby lost by 4–5 on penalties to Malmö FF after the game ended in a 0–0 draw.

Celta
On 17 June 2022, Swedberg transferred to Celta de Vigo in La Liga, signing a contract until the summer of 2027. The fee was reportedly set at around €5 million, plus bonuses and a sell-on clause, making it a record breaking transfer for Hammarby.

International career
Swedberg scored in his debut for the Sweden U17 national team in a 3–1 friendly win against Norway on 17 September 2019.

Style of play
A right-footed player with good technique, Swedberg is often deployed as an attacking central midfielder. He is a space operator and likes to get into the vacated spaces and make movements off-the-ball, much like Thomas Müller and Donny van de Beek. Known for his first touch and vision, Swedberg tends to often pass or carry the ball into the penalty area.

Personal life
He is the son of the former professional footballers Hans Eskilsson and Malin Swedberg. Due to partially growing up in Valencia, Swedberg became trilingual from an early age. After his move to Celta in 2022, he said that his Spanish fluency surprised 'many' around the club.

Career statistics

Club

References

External links

2004 births
Footballers from Stockholm
Living people
Swedish footballers
Association football midfielders
Sweden youth international footballers
IK Frej players
Hammarby Fotboll players
Hammarby Talang FF players
RC Celta de Vigo players
Ettan Fotboll players
Allsvenskan players
Swedish expatriate footballers
Expatriate footballers in Spain
Swedish expatriate sportspeople in Spain